The Village School an independent coeducational day school, serving students ages 18 months to 14 years, located in the Borough of Waldwick, in Bergen County, New Jersey, United States. The Village School is a Montessori school for children ranging from toddler to Middle School. Its programs are based in the fundamental philosophy of Dr. Maria Montessori. It is the one of the only Montessori schools in New Jersey to serve students ranging up to fifteen years of age.

As of the 2009–2010 school year, the school served 235 students, with 105 in pre-school and 129 in its  Kindergarten through eighth grade program. There were 24 students in kindergarten, approximately 16 students per class in grades 1–3, and approximately 19 students per class in grades 4–8.

The Village School is the New Jersey satellite school for the Center for Montessori Teacher Education, in which individuals in North Jersey are trained as instructors in the Montessori pedagogical methodology. A number of teachers at the Village School have participated in this program as mentor teachers.

Accreditation
The Village School is accredited by the American Montessori Society and by the Middle States Association of Colleges and Schools since 1993. The school is a member of the New Jersey Association of Independent Schools.

History
The Village School was founded in 1977 in Ridgewood. Since its founding, the School expanded to several sites in Ridgewood, before consolidating these sites in Glen Rock. In September 1996, after an interim year in Ridgewood, the school relocated to its current School-owned facility in Waldwick during the summer of 2002, a site it purchased from Berkeley College.

References

External links 
The Village School website
Data for The Village School, National Center for Education Statistics

Private elementary schools in New Jersey
Schools in Bergen County, New Jersey
New Jersey Association of Independent Schools
Private middle schools in New Jersey